Nedeljko Malić (Serbian Cyrillic: Недељко Малић; born 15 May 1988) is a Bosnian-Herzegovinian  association football player. He plays as a defender and has won two caps for the Bosnia and Herzegovina national under-21 football team.

References

1988 births
Living people
Sportspeople from Banja Luka
Serbs of Bosnia and Herzegovina
Austrian people of Bosnia and Herzegovina descent
Austrian people of Serbian descent
Association football defenders
Austrian footballers
Bosnia and Herzegovina footballers
Bosnia and Herzegovina under-21 international footballers
SV Mattersburg players
Indy Eleven players
Austrian Football Bundesliga players
2. Liga (Austria) players
USL Championship players
Bosnia and Herzegovina expatriate footballers
Expatriate soccer players in the United States
Bosnia and Herzegovina expatriate sportspeople in the United States